Travonti Johnson (born May 9, 1984) was an American football safety. He was signed by the New York Giants as an undrafted free agent in 2007. He played college football at UCF.

Early life
Johnson attended Dr. Michael M. Krop High School in Miami, Florida.

College career
Johnson attended the University of Central Florida, where he was a member of the UCF Knights football team.

Professional career
After going undrafted in the 2007 NFL Draft, Johnson signed as an undrafted free agent with the New York Giants.

Johnson has also been a member of the Billings Outlaws.

After spending the 2008 and 2009 seasons with the Outlaws, Johnson was signed by the Giants again.

After spending the entire 2009 season on the Giants practice squad, Johnson returned to the Outlaws.

On June 13, 2016, Johnson signed with the Billings Wolves.

On January 30, 2017, Johnson signed with the Dodge City Law.

On June 14, 2017, Johnson signed with the Monterrey Steel.

On July 25, 2017, Johnson signed with the Salina Liberty. On April 12, 2018, Johnson was released.

On April 12, 2018, Johnson signed with the Texas Revolution.

References

External links
Billings Outlaws bio
New York Giants bio
UCF Knights bio

1984 births
Living people
Players of American football from Miami
American football cornerbacks
American football safeties
UCF Knights football players
New York Giants players
Billings Outlaws players
Omaha Beef players
Iowa Barnstormers players
Allen Wranglers players
Nebraska Danger players
Cedar Rapids River Kings players
Billings Wolves players
River City Raiders players
Dodge City Law players
Monterrey Steel players
Salina Liberty players
Texas Revolution players